Automeris cecrops, the cecrops eyed silkmoth, is a species of insect in the family Saturniidae. It is found in Central America and North America.

The MONA or Hodges number for Automeris cecrops is 7748.

Subspecies
These three subspecies belong to the species Automeris cecrops:
 Automeris cecrops cecrops (Boisduval, 1875)
 Automeris cecrops pamina (Neumoegen, 1882)
 Automeris cecrops peigleri Lemaire, 1981

References

Further reading

 
 
 

Hemileucinae
Articles created by Qbugbot
Moths described in 1875